Fellhanera robusta is a species of crustose lichen in the family Pilocarpaceae. Found in Australia, it was described as a new species in 2017 by lichenologists John Elix and Patrick McCarthy. The type specimen was collected from a vertical shale cliff in Callala Bay (Jervis Bay, New South Wales). This location receives sea spray as well as surface runoff from above, and maintains a diverse lichen flora that contrasts with the absence of lichens in the surrounding shore area.

The authors describe it as "variously verrucose, bullate or contorted" and "irregularly cerebriform"; its specific epithet alludes to its unusual form. The lichen contains the secondary chemicals atranorin and norgangaleoidin. Its ascospores measure 8–15 by 3.5–7 μm.

A lookalike species, Fellhanera incolorata, grows on mangrove bark in southern New South Wales. In addition to the different habitat, it can be distinguished from F. robusta by differences in the thickness and form of its thallus, in secondary chemistry (F. incolorata contains atranorin and thuringione), and in spore size.

References

Pilocarpaceae
Lichen species
Lichens described in 2017
Lichens of Australia
Taxa named by John Alan Elix